Promecoderus is a genus of ground beetle in the subfamily Broscinae. The genus was described by Pierre François Marie Auguste Dejean in 1829 with the genus being found in Australia and is divided into six groups with several subgroups:

1. albaniensis group (sensu Sloane, 1890; Roig-Juñent, 2000)
 Promecoderus albaniensis Laporte de Castelnau, 1867
 Promecoderus pacificus Sloane, 1890
 Promecoderus pygmaeus Laporte de Castelnau, 1867
2. brunnicornis group (sensu Sloane, 1890; Roig-Juñent, 2000)
 Promecoderus brunnicornis Dejean, 1829
3. clivinoides group (sensu Sloane, 1890, 1898; Roig-Juñent, 2000)
 Promecoderus castelnaui Sloane, 1892
 Promecoderus clivinoides Guérin-Ménéville, 1841
 Promecoderus comes Sloane, 1890
 Promecoderus dyschirioides Guérin-Ménéville, 1841
 Promecoderus hunteriensis Macleay, 1873
 Promecoderus intermedius Sloane, 1898
 Promecoderus interruptus Macleay, 1873
 Promecoderus lei Sloane, 1898
 Promecoderus maritimus Laporte de Castelnau, 1867
 Promecoderus nigellus Sloane, 1890
 Promecoderus nigricornis Laporte de Castelnau, 1867
 Promecoderus ovipennis Sloane, 1898
 Promecoderus scauroides Laporte de Castelnau, 1867
 Promecoderus sloanei Blackburn, 1901
 Promecoderus striatopunctatus Laporte de Castelnau, 1867
 Promecoderus wilcoxii Laporte de Castelnau, 1867
4. concolor group (sensu Sloane, 1890; Roig-Juñent, 2000)
 Promecoderus blackburni Sloane, 1890
 Promecoderus concolor Germar, 1848
 Promecoderus insignis Sloane, 1890
5. gibbosus-subdepressus-inornatus group (Sensu Sloane, 1890; Roig-Juñent, 2000)
5a. gibbosus subgroup
 Promecoderus basii Laporte de Castelnau, 1867
 Promecoderus gibbosus G. R. Gray, 1832
 Promecoderus mastersii Macleay, 1873
5b. inornatus subgroup
 Promecoderus dorsalis Macleay, 1873
 Promecoderus inornatus Macleay, 1873
 Promecoderus neglectus Laporte de Castelnau, 1867
 Promecoderus olivaceus Macleay, 1873
 Promecoderus semistriatus Laporte de Castelnau, 1867
5c. subdepressus subgroup
 Promecoderus curvipes Sloane, 1920
 Promecoderus elegans Laporte de Castelnau, 1867
 Promecoderus modestus Laporte de Castelnau, 1867
 Promecoderus clivinoides Guérin-Ménéville, 1841
6. unassociated species
 Promecoderus anguliceps Sloane, 1898
 Promecoderus cordicollis Sloane, 1908
 Promecoderus lottini Brullé, 1834
 Promecoderus riverinae Macleay, 1873
 Promecoderus viridianeus Sloane, 1915

References

Broscini
Carabidae genera